Lydiane is a town in east central Senegal in Kaolack region.

Transport 

It is the terminus of a branchline off the main Dakar-Niger Railway from Guinguinéo.

See also 

 Railway stations in Senegal

References 

Populated places in Kaolack Region